The Music Bank Chart is a record chart established in 1998 on the South Korean KBS television music program Music Bank. Every week during its live broadcast, the show gives an award for the best-performing single on the South Korean chart. The chart includes digital performance on domestic online music services (65%), album sales (5%), number of times the single was broadcast on KBS TV (20%), and viewers' choice (10%) in its ranking methodology. The score for domestic online music services is calculated using data from Melon, Bugs, Genie Music and Naver Vibe. Soribada was also used until November 2020, when it was replaced by Flo. The show was hosted by actress Shin Ye-eun and Golden Child member Choi Bo-min till July 17, 2020. Arin, a member of girl group Oh My Girl and Tomorrow X Together member Choi Soo-bin were announced as new hosts the following week.

In 2020, 31 singles reached number one on the chart, and 24 acts were awarded first-place trophies. "On" by BTS debuted at number one and stayed there for four consecutive weeks. It went on to achieve the highest score of the year, 11,957, on the March 6 broadcast. Their next single, "Dynamite", topped the chart for 12 non-consecutive weeks, making it the song with the most weeks at number one during the year. The two songs spent a total of 16 weeks atop the chart, making BTS the act with the most wins of the year. Red Velvet's sub-unit Red Velvet – Irene & Seulgi received their first music show win on the July 17 broadcast with "Monster". Girl group (G)I-dle received their first Music Bank trophy for "Oh My God". Exo member Suho received his first music show award for his debut single "Let's Love".

The first number-one single of the year was "Psycho" by girl group Red Velvet, which was released the previous year. It debuted at number one and stayed there for three non-consecutive weeks. SF9 achieved their first number one with "Good Guy" from their first Korean studio album First Collection. Zico of boy group Block B received his first Music Bank trophy as a soloist for "Any Song" after it went viral when he started a dance challenge by posting videos of himself and South Korean singers Hwasa and Chungha dancing to the song on TikTok with the hashtag "Any Song Challenge". NCT's sub-unit NCT Dream won their first Music Bank award with "Ridin' on the May 8 broadcast.

Chart history

Notes

References 

2020 in South Korean music
2020 record charts
Lists of number-one songs in South Korea